Kim Ha-eun (born Kim Hyun-jin; January 3, 1984) is a South Korean actress. She is best known for her roles in the television series Conspiracy in the Court, and The Slave Hunters.

She is also the CEO of the online clothing store 301호 고양이.

Filmography

Television series

Film

Awards and nominations

References

External links

1984 births
Living people
21st-century South Korean actresses
Dongduk Women's University alumni
JYP Entertainment artists
Place of birth missing (living people)
South Korean film actresses
South Korean television actresses